South Street Bridge is a bridge that was reconstructed in 2010 in Philadelphia, Pennsylvania.

History
The original South Street Bridge was a crumbling bridge dating back to 1920. From 2003 to until its closure in 2009, pieces of the eroding bridge concrete would fall into the Schuylkill River and onto the Schuylkill Expressway.  The original bridge was completely torn down and replaced by November 6, 2010.

Architectural features
South Street Bridge is notable landmark in Philadelphia as drivers along the Schuylkill Expressway can see images on its glowing mesh. Bruce Chamberlain said that the mesh "... gave the bridge a soft glow at night, while maintaining the openness desired by the design team and community."
 The lights stopped working in 2017, and haven't been up since then.  Stimulus funding also subsidized connections from the new bridge to a "boardwalk" on the Schuylkill River Trail, which passes under the bridge.

See also
List of crossings of the Schuylkill River

References

Bridges in Philadelphia
Bridges over the Schuylkill River
Concrete bridges in the United States
Road bridges in Pennsylvania
Steel bridges in the United States
South Philadelphia
West Philadelphia